Grebes are aquatic diving birds in the order Podicipediformes . Grebes are widely distributed freshwater birds, with some species also found in marine habitats during migration and winter. Some flightless species exist as well, most notably in stable lakes. The order contains a single family, the Podicipedidae, which includes 22 species in six extant genera. Although, superficially, they resemble other diving birds such as loons and coots, they are most closely related to flamingos, as supported by morphological, molecular and paleontological data. Many species are monogamous and are known for their courtship displays, with the pair performing synchronized dances across the water's surface. The birds build floating vegetative nests where they lay several eggs. About a third of the world's grebes are listed at various levels of conservation concerns—the biggest threats including habitat loss, the introduction of invasive predatory fish and human poaching. As such, three species have gone extinct.

Etymology
The word "grebe" comes from the French "grèbe" which is of unknown origin dating to 1766, possibly from the Breton "krib" meaning comb referring to the crests of many of the European species. However, "grèbe" was used to refer to gulls. The appearance of "grebe" in the English language was introduced in 1768 by the Welsh naturalist Thomas Pennant when he adopted the word for the family. Some of the smaller species are often referred to as "dabchick", which originated in the mid 16th century English as they were said to be chick-like birds that dive. The clade names "Podicipediformes" and "Podicipedidae" is based on the genus Podiceps which is a combination of Latin of podicis ("near-end" or "anus") and pes ("foot"), a reference to the placement of a grebe's legs towards the rear of its body.

Field characteristics

Despite these size differences grebes are a homogenous family of waterbirds with very few or slight differences among the genera.

Anatomy and physiology

On the surface of the water they swim low with just the head and neck exposed. All species have lobed toes, and are excellent swimmers and divers. The feet are always large, with broad lobes on the toes and small webs connecting the front three toes. The hind toe also has a small lobe as well. The claws are similar to nails and are flat. These lobate feet act as an oar, as when moving forward they provide minimum resistance and moving backwards they provide a coverage of maximum surface. The leg bones femur and tarsometatarsus are equal in length, with the femur having a large head and the presence of long cnemial crests in the tarsometatarsus. The patella is separate and supports tarsometatarsus posteriorly which greatly helps with the contraction in the muscles. They swim by simultaneously spreading out the feet and bringing them inward, with the webbing expanded to produce the forward thrust in much the same way as frogs. However, due to the anatomy of the legs, grebes are not as mobile on land as they are on the water. Although they can run for a short distance, they are prone to falling over, since they have their feet placed far back on the body.

The wing shape varies depending on the species, ranging from moderately long to incredibly short and rounded in shape. The wing anatomy in grebes has relatively short and thin carpometacarpus-phalanges component which supports their primaries, while the ulna is long and fairly weak supporting secondaries. There are 11 primaries and 17 to 22 secondaries, with the inner secondaries being longer than the primaries. As such grebes are generally not strong or rapid fliers as some species are reluctant to fly. Indeed, two South American species are completely flightless. Since grebes mostly dive more than fly, the sternum can be as small or even smaller than the pelvic girdle. When they do fly, they often launch themselves off from the water and must run along the surface as they flap their wings to provide a lift.
 
Bills vary from short and thick to long and pointed depending on the diet, and are slightly larger in males than in females (though the sizes can overlap between younger males and females).

Feathers

Grebes have unusual plumage. On average grebes have 20,000 feathers, the highest among most birds. The feathers are very dense and strongly curved. In the larger species it is more dense but shorter the feathers, while the opposite is true in smaller species where the feathers are longer but less dense. The density and length of feathers correlated exponentially with heat-loss in cold water. For this reason grebes invest plumage maintenance the most in birds, where the uropygial glands secretes high concentration of paraffin. The secretion provides a dual purpose of protecting the feathers from external parasites and fungi, as well as waterproofing them. When preening, grebes eat their own feathers and feed them to their young. The function of this behaviour is uncertain, but it is believed to assist with pellet formation, excreting out internal parasites and to protect their insides from the sharp bone material during digestion. The ventral plumage is the most dense described to be very fur-like. By pressing their feathers against the body, grebes can adjust their buoyancy. In the nonbreeding season, grebes are plain-coloured in dark browns and whites. However, most have ornate and distinctive breeding plumages, often developing chestnut markings on the head area, and perform elaborate display rituals. The young, particularly those of the genus Podiceps, are often striped and retain some of their juvenile plumage even after reaching full size.

Systematics

The grebes are a radically distinct group of birds as regards their anatomy. Accordingly, they were at first believed to be related to the loons, which are also foot-propelled diving birds, and both families were once classified together under the order Colymbiformes. However, as early as the 1930s, this was determined to be an example of convergent evolution by the strong selective forces encountered by unrelated birds sharing the same lifestyle at different times and in different habitat. Grebes and loons are now separately classified orders of Podicipediformes and Gaviiformes, respectively. Recent molecular studies have suggested a relation with flamingos while morphological evidence also strongly supports a relationship between flamingos and grebes. They hold at least eleven morphological traits in common, which are not found in other birds. Many of these characteristics have been previously identified in flamingos, but not in grebes. For the grebe-flamingo clade, the taxon Mirandornithes ("miraculous birds" due to their extreme divergence and apomorphies) has been proposed. Alternatively, they could be placed in one order, with Phoenocopteriformes taking priority.

Fossil record
 
The fossil record of grebes is incomplete as there are no transitional forms between more conventional birds and the highly derived grebes known from fossils. The enigmatic waterbird genus Juncitarsus, however, may be close to a common ancestor of flamingos and grebes. The extinct stem-flamingo family Palaelodidae have been suggested to be the transitional linkage between the filter-feeding flamingos and the foot-propelled diving grebes. The evidence for this comes from the overall similarity between the foot and limb structure of grebes and palaeloids, suggesting the latter family of waterbirds were able to swim and dive better so than flamingos. Some early grebes even share similar characteristics in the coracoid and humerus seen in palaeloids.

True grebes suddenly appear in the fossil record in the Late Oligocene or Early Miocene, around 23–25 mya. While there are a few prehistoric genera that are now completely extinct. Thiornis (Late Miocene –? Early Pliocene of Libros, Spain) and Pliolymbus (Late Pliocene of WC USA – Early? Pleistocene of Chapala, Mexico) date from a time when most if not all extant genera were already present. Because grebes are evolutionarily isolated and they only started to appear in the Northern Hemisphere fossil record in the Early Miocene, they are likely to have originated in the Southern Hemisphere.

 Genus Aechmophorus Coues, 1862
 †Aechmophorus elasson Murray, 1967 (Piacenzian stage of western United States)
 Genus †Miobaptus Švec, 1982
 †Miobaptus huzhiricus Zelenkov, 2015 (Burdigalian to the Langhian ages of East Siberia)
 †Miobaptus walteri Švec, 1982 [Podiceps walteri (Švec, 1984) Mlíkovský, 2000] (Aquitanian age of Europe)
 Genus †Miodytes Dimitreijevich, Gál & Kessler, 2002
 †Miodytes serbicus Dimitreijevich, Gál & Kessler, 2002 (Langhian age of Serbia)
 Genus †Pliolymbus Murray, 1967 [Piliolymbus (sic)]
 †Pliolymbus baryosteus Murray, 1967 (Piacenzian to the Gelasian stages of western United States and Mexico)
 Genus Podiceps Latham 1787
 †Podiceps arndti Chandler, 1990 (Piacenzian stage of North America)
 †Podiceps csarnotanus Kessler, 2009 (Piacenzian stage of Europe)
 †Podiceps discors Murray, 1967 (Piacenzian stage of North America)
 †Podiceps dixi Brodkorp, 1963 (Chibanian to the Tarantian stages of Florida, United States)
 †Podiceps howardae Storer, 2001 (Zanclean age of North Carolina, United States)
 †Podiceps miocenicus Kessler, 1984 (Tortonian age of Moldova)
 †Podiceps oligoceanus (Shufeldt, 1915) (Aquitanian age of North America)
 †Podiceps parvus (Shufeldt, 1913) (Gelasian to the Calabrian stages of North America)
 †Podiceps pisanus (Portis, 1888)  (Piacenzian stage of Italy)
 †Podiceps solidus Kuročkin, 1985 (Zanclean age of Western Mongolia)
 †Podiceps subparvus (Miller & Bowman, 1958) 
 Genus Podilymbus Lesson 1831
 †Podilymbus majusculus Murray 1967 (Piacenzian stage of Idaho, United States)
 †Podilymbus wetmorei Storer 1976 (Chibanian to the Tarantian stages of Florida, United States)
 Genus †Thiornis Navás, 1922
 †Thiornis sociata Navás, 1922 [Podiceps sociatus (Navás, 1922) Olson, 1995] (Tortonian age of Spain)

A few more recent grebe fossils could not be assigned to modern or prehistoric genera:
Podicipedidae gen. et sp. indet. (San Diego Late Pliocene of California) – formerly included in Podiceps parvus
Podicipedidae gen. et sp. indet. UMMP 49592, 52261, 51848, 52276, KUVP 4484 (Late Pliocene of WC USA)
Podicipedidae gen. et sp. indet. (Glenns Ferry Late Pliocene/Early Pleistocene of Idaho, USA)

Phylogeny
To date there is no complete phylogeny of grebes based on molecular work. However, there are comprehensive morphological work from Bochenski (1994), Fjeldså (2004) and Ksepka et al. (2013) that has been done on the grebe genera.

Bochenski (1994)

Fjeldså (2004) 

Ksepka et al. (2013)

Recent species listing

Natural history

Habitat, distribution and migration
Grebes are a nearly cosmopolitan clade of waterbirds, found on every continent except Antarctica. They are absent from the Arctic circle and arid environments. They have successfully colonized and radiated into islands such as Madagascar and New Zealand. Some species such as the eared grebe (P. nigricollis) and great crested grebe (P. cristatus) are found in multiple continents with regional subspecies or populations. A few species like the Junin grebe (P. taczanowskii) and the recently extinct Atitlan grebe (Podilymbus gigas) are lake endemics. During the warmer or breeding seasons, many species of grebes in the northern hemisphere reside in a variety of freshwater habitats like lakes and marshes. Once winter arrives many will migrate to marine environments usually along the coastlines. The species is most prevalent in the New World with almost half of the world's species living in this part of the world.

Feeding ecology

The feeding ecology of grebes is diverse within the group. Larger species such as those in the genus Aechmophorus have spear-like bills to catch mid-depth fish while smaller species such as those in the genera Tachybaptus and Podilymbus tend to be short and stout with a preference for catching small aquatic invertebrates. There are much more species of grebes that predate on aquatic invertebrates, with only a handful of large-bodied piscivores. The aforementioned Aechmophorusis the most piscivorous of the grebes. Closely related species that overlap in their often avoid interspecific competition by having prey preferences and adaptations for it. In areas where there is just as a single species, they tend to have more generalized bill with more open preferences to different prey sources.

Breeding and reproduction
Grebes are perhaps best known for their elaborate courtship displays. Most species perform a duet together and many have their own synchronized rituals. Some like those species in the genus Podiceps do the iconic "penguin dance" where the male and female stand upright, breast posturing out and run along the water's surface. A similar ritual in other species is the "weed dance" in which both partners hold pieces of aquatic vegetation in their bills and positioned upright towards each other. Similarly there is the "weed rush" in which partners would swim towards each other, necks stretched out with weeds in their bill, and just before colliding do posture themselves upright and then swim in parallel. In the smaller and basal genera like Tachybaptus and Podilymbus there is some form of incorporation of aquatic vegetation in their courtship, but it is not as elaborate as the more derived and larger species. It has been hypothesized that such courtship displays between mates originated from intraspecific aggression that evolved in a way it strengthen pair bonds. Once these courtship rituals are completed, both partners would solicit copulation towards each other and would mount on these floating platforms of vegetation. Sometimes they become nests, although often they build a more well structured platform. Females lay two to seven eggs and incubation can last nearly a month. Chicks of the nest hatch asynchronously and once the whole nest has hatched, do the chicks begin to climb on one of their parent's backs. Both parents take care of rearing their young, and the duration of care is longer than those of waterfowl. This enables a greater success rate of survival for the chicks. One parent would dive while the other would watch the young on the surface.

Parasitology

249 species of parasitic worms have been known to parasitized the intestinal region of grebes. The amabiliids are a family of cyclophyllid cestodes that are nearly grebe specialists, with 28 of the 29 that infect the intestines. The life cycle of these tapeworms begins when eggs are passed through the feces, where they are picked by the intermediate host which include corixid bugs and the nymphs of Odonata. These aquatic insects would eventually be consumed by grebes where the lifecycle would repeat again. Another grebe specialist family of internal parasites are the Dioecocestidae. Other families such as Echinostomatidae and Hymenolepididae also contained several cestode species that are grebe specialists, though other species in those families have infect other waterbird lineages.

The prominent external parasites are the lice of the clade Ischnocera with several genera and species are known to parasitized grebes and other waterbirds. One genus of these lice Aquanirmus is the only one that is a grebe specialist. Another major group are the two mites of the families Rhinonyssidae and Ereynetidae infect the nasal passages of grebes where the rhinonyssids move slowly in the mucus membranes drinking blood, while the ereynetids live on the surface. Various lineages of feather mites of the clade Analgoidea have evolved to occupy different sections of the feather. There is a leech, the genus Theromyzon ("duck leeches") that tends to feed in the nasal cavities of waterbirds in general including grebes.

Conservation

Thirty percent of the total extant species are considered to be threaten species by the IUCN. The handful of critically endangered and extinct species of grebe are those of lake endemics and nearly all of them are or were flightless. The extinct species consists of the Alaotra grebe (T. rufolavatus), the Atitlán grebe, and the Colombian grebe (P. andinus). These species went extinct due to anthropogenic changes, such as habitat loss, the introduction of invasive predatory fishes, and the usage of fishing nets that tangled birds in the lakes they once existed in. These are the same issues along with climate change that are happening to the Colombian grebe's closest relatives, the Junin grebe and hooded grebe (P. gallardoi).

See also
List of Podicipediformes by population

References

Further reading
Konter, André (2001): Grebes of our world: visiting all species on 5 continents. Lynx Edicions, Barcelona. 
Ogilvie, Malcolm & Rose, Chris (2003): Grebes of the World. Bruce Coleman Books, Uxbridge, England. 
Sibley, Charles Gald & Monroe, Burt L. Jr. (1990): Distribution and taxonomy of the birds of the world: A Study in Molecular Evolution. Yale University Press, New Haven, CT.

External links

Grebe videos and photos on the Internet Bird Collection
Tree of Life Grebes 
openclipart.org: Grebes clip-art
Diving Birds of North America by Paul Johnsgard
Grebes Walk on Water  Documentary produced by Oregon Field Guide
Grebe Vocalization - The Songs of The Grebes

Podicipedidae
Podicipediformes
Diving animals
Extant Chattian first appearances
Taxa named by Charles Lucien Bonaparte